Thomas Alexander McLean (7 July 1876 – 14 August 1948) was an Australian rules footballer who played with Collingwood and Geelong in the Victorian Football League (VFL).

He played VFL football with Geelong  while studying to become a doctor and while a resident doctor at Geelong Hospital, before commencing private practice in Traralgon.

McLean played for Traralgon in 1905 and 1906 and would later become President of the Traralgon Football Club.

McLean also played 11 first eleven games of Premier Cricket with the University Cricket Club.

Notes

External links 

Tom McLean's profile at Collingwood Forever

1876 births
1948 deaths
Australian rules footballers from Victoria (Australia)
Collingwood Football Club players
Geelong Football Club players